"She's Got a Single Thing in Mind" is a song written by Walt Aldridge, and recorded by American country music artist Conway Twitty.  It was released in April 1989 as the first single from the album House on Old Lonesome Road.  The song reached #2 on the Billboard Hot Country Singles & Tracks chart.

Chart performance

Year-end charts

References

1989 singles
1989 songs
Conway Twitty songs
Songs written by Walt Aldridge
Song recordings produced by Jimmy Bowen
MCA Records singles